Daviesia purpurascens, commonly known as purple-leaved daviesia, is a species of flowering plant in the family Fabaceae and is endemic to the south-west of Western Australia. It is a glabrous shrub with many branchlets, scattered, erect, cylindrical, sharply pointed phyllodes and yellow and maroon flowers.

Description

Taxonomy
Daviesia purpurascens was first formally described in 1995 by Michael Crisp in the Journal of the Adelaide Botanic Gardens from specimens collected near Bendering by Ian Brooker in 1979. The specific epithet (purpurascens) means "becoming purplish".

Distribution and habitat
Purple-leaved daviesia grows in the shrub layer of mallee woodland in five disjunct populations in the Avon Wheatbelt, Coolgardie, Esperance Plains, Great Victoria Desert, Mallee and Murchison biogeographic region of south-western Western Australia.

Conservation status 
Daviesia purpurascens is listed as "not threatened" by the Government of Western Australia Department of Biodiversity, Conservation and Attractions,

References 

purpurascens
Taxa named by Michael Crisp
Plants described in 1995
Flora of Western Australia